Ali 'Zill-e-Shah' Bilal was a Lahore-based Pakistani who was abducted on March 8, 2023, by the Police of Punjab, Pakistan commanded by CCPO-Lahore, IG, Bilal Siddique Kamyanay while he was protesting against the state terrorism by the administration of Chief Minister, Mohsin Naqvi.

Ali was allegedly brutally tortured by the police during the custody on his skull, jaw, arms, private parts, spleen and liver which eventually resulted in his death the same day. The dead body of Ali 'Zill-e-Shah' Bilal was then dropped on a bridge in Lahore potentially by Police which was discovered by a black Toyota Vigo driver who escorted the body to a hospital in a hope that he would survive.

Background
The Punjab police officials took several PTI workers into custody and during the rally the Police used water cannons to disperse them for violating the ban on gatherings. The police crackdown resulted in Bilal's death and Imran Khan's accusation of police involvement. An FIR was filed by DSP Sabir Ali of Lahore's Race Course police station alleging that PTI workers attacked police personnel with stones and sticks, leading to Bilal's death. The FIR was filed under the Anti-Terrorism Act and the Pakistan Penal Code.

Investigation
The Punjab Inspector General of Police, Humayun Bashir Tarar, established a fact-finding committee to investigate the incident, with a focus on Bilal's death. The investigation team is responsible for gathering witness statements and CCTV footage to answer questions about the circumstances surrounding the incident, including Bilal's death, whether he was in police custody, and who took him to the hospital.

According to a post-mortem examination conducted by a three-member forensic team from General Hospital, Bilal died from excessive bleeding caused by severe torture. The report identified 26 marks of torture on the victim's body, including sensitive areas, with part of his skull significantly affected. Blood accumulation in the liver and pancreas, as well as a drop in blood pressure due to brain hemorrhage, contributed to his death.

Reactions
Bilal's death sparked protests in Lahore, with PTI workers demanding justice for him. Imran Khan expressed outrage over the incident and accused the police of targeting PTI workers. Other political parties and civil society organizations criticized the incident, demanding an impartial investigation into the matter. Former Punjab's Chief Minister, Usman Buzdar, expressed his condolences to Bilal's family and assured them of a fair investigation into his death.

References

2023 in Punjab, Pakistan
March 2023 events in Pakistan